Navolok is a rural locality (a village) in Orlovskoye Rural Settlement, Velikoustyugsky District, Vologda Oblast, Russia. The population was 19 as of 2002.

Geography 
Navolok is located 61 km southeast of Veliky Ustyug (the district's administrative centre) by road. Pavlovo is the nearest rural locality.

References 

Rural localities in Velikoustyugsky District